The Preferred Executable Format is a file format that specifies the format of executable files and other object code. PEF executables are also called Code Fragment Manager files (CFM).

PEF was developed by Apple Computer for use in its classic Mac OS operating system. It was optimised for RISC processors. In macOS, the Mach-O file format is the native executable format. However, PEF was still supported on PowerPC-based Macintoshes running Mac OS X and was used by some Carbon applications ported from earlier versions for classic Mac OS, so that the same binary could be run on classic Mac OS and Mac OS X.

BeOS on PowerPC systems also uses PEF, although x86 systems do not.

See also
 Comparison of executable file formats
 Fat binary

External links
 PEF Structure - documentation at developer.apple.com via web.archive.org
 Mac OS Runtime Architectures For System 7 Through Mac OS 9 - PDF from developer.apple.com (see chapter 8, PEF Structure)
 dumppef Documentation - description of what is in a PEF file, such as allowed sections the string table.

Executable file formats
Apple Inc. software